City Radio may refer to:

 City Radio (Bulgaria)
 City Radio (Croatia)

See also
 Radio City (disambiguation)